Victoria College School is an international private, non-profit, co-educational day school in Amman, Jordan. It is from kindergarten through high school. The school has branches in Egypt and Saudi Arabia and other countries.

Facilities include:
 Twenty-three classrooms
 Library
 Music Room
 Physics, Chemistry, Biology Labs
 Art Room
 Soccer, basketball courts
 Auditorium 
 computer rooms

On 25 October 2018, 44 students and staff members had been swept away by floods in the Dead Sea region in Amman, Jordan, whilst on a field trip, which resulted in 18 deaths and 34 injuries in what has been called the Dead Sea disaster.

There has been immense backlash aimed at the school following the accident; criticizing that the school allowed the field trip during unstable weather and the fact that the official documents stated that the destination for the field trip was not the Dead Sea but Al Azraq region. The documents also reveal that the approved number of students was 30, when in fact 37 students attended the trip.

References

Schools in Amman